Tzukim (lit. Cliffs), also Zukim, is a community settlement in southern Israel. Located in the Arava, 8 km south of Tzofar, it falls under jurisdiction of the Central Arava Regional Council.

History
Tzukim was founded in 2001 on land vacated by the Bildad army camp, which was founded in 1983 and named after Bildad, one of the "friends" of Biblical Job. In the Negev there are also kibbutzim with the names of the two other "friends": nearby Tzofar and Elifaz in the southern Arava. 
Bildad also served as a transit point for new settlement in the Arabah valley.

The first settlement phase of Tzukim was supposed to begin in 2003, with fifty families. The first settlers were people in their 40s from central Israel. Tzukim's economy is  mainly based on tourism, education and art. 200 guest houses are planned here as well as restaurants and spas. By 2008, twelve rooms had been built and with 70 under construction.
Today there 3 active kindergartens and also a youth movement in the settlement.

References

Central Arava Regional Council
Populated places in Southern District (Israel)
Populated places established in 2001
2001 establishments in Israel